Triathlon at the 2014 Summer Youth Olympics was held from 17 to 21 August at Xuanwu Lake in Nanjing, China.

Qualification

Each National Olympic Committee (NOC) can enter a maximum of 2 competitors, 1 per each gender. As hosts, China was given the maximum quota, but only selected a female athlete thus the other quota was reallocated to the next best Asian performer. A further 4, 2 in each gender was decided by the Tripartite Commission. The remaining 58 places shall be decided by qualification events, namely five continental qualification tournaments.

To be eligible to participate at the Youth Olympics athletes must have been born between 1 January 1997 and 31 December 1998.

Boys

Girls

Schedule

The schedule was released by the ITU.

All times are CST (UTC+8)

Medal summary

Medal table

Events

References

External links
Official Results Book – Triathlon

 
2014 Summer Youth Olympics events
Youth Summer Olympics
2014
Triathlon competitions in China